"Bitches" (stylised in lowercase letters) is a song by Swedish singer Tove Lo from her third studio album, Blue Lips (2017). The official remix featuring Charli XCX, Icona Pop, Elliphant and Alma was released on 7 June 2018 as a single.

Background and development
On 28 October 2016, Lo released her second studio album, Lady Wood, which is split in two parts, "Fairy Dust" and "Fire Fade". Two short films inspired by these two chapters were released on YouTube and Vevo. The first one, Fairy Dust, was released on 31 October 2016, three days after the album's release. It is based on the first six songs of the album; however, "Bitches", at that time titled "(What I Want for the Night) Bitches", was played during the film's end-credits scene. A live version of the song was recorded and released on Spotify. The singer also performed the song on her Lady Wood Tour.

The studio version of the song was later included on Lo's third album, Blue Lips, released on 17 November 2017.

On 4 June 2018, Lo announced the remix of the song, featuring Charli XCX, Icona Pop, Elliphant and ALMA, which was released as the second single from Blue Lips on 7 June 2018, alongside the music video.

Music video
The music video for "Bitches", directed by Broad City director Lucia Aniello, was released on 7 June 2018. The video features Broad City actor Paul W. Downs and actress Jessy Hodges as a couple who go to the supergroup for training on how to spice up their sex life. The video shows the couple being applied with BDSM accessories, before educating them about various sex tips and the singers putting the couple in a cage to take a break to eat sushi takeout. The video ends with Downs' character showing what he has learned, ducking offscreen under his partner as the singers dance in a room with multicolored neon lights.

Track listing
Digital download
"Bitches" – 3:11

Credits and personnel
Adapted from Tidal.

 Tove Lo – lead vocals, composer, lyricist
 Elliphant – featured artist, composer, lyricist
 Nicki Adamsson – composer
 Ali Payami – composer, producer, programmer, studio personnel
 Charli XCX – featured artist
 Alma – featured artist
 Icona Pop – featured artist
 Chris Galland – mixing engineer, studio personnel
 Björn Engelmann – mastering engineer, studio personnel
 Robin Florent – assistant mixer, studio personnel
 Scott Desmarais – assistant mixer, studio personnel
 Manny Marroquin – mixer, studio personnel

References

2017 songs
2018 singles
Tove Lo songs
Alma (Finnish singer) songs
Charli XCX songs
Elliphant songs
Icona Pop songs
LGBT-related songs
Songs written by Ali Payami
Songs written by Elliphant
Songs written by Tove Lo